Den vægelsindede is a Danish play. 
The three-act comedy was written by Ludvig Holberg (1684–1754) and was published in 1722.

English translations

References

External links
Den vægelsindede    (Ludvig Holberg Homepage)

Plays by Ludvig Holberg
1722 plays